ACRC may refer to:
 Acidic repeat containing, a gene
Anti-Corruption and Civil Rights Commission in South Korea
Asian Communication Resource Centre in Singapore
The American Civil Rights Coalition, in the US
The Andalusia and Conecuh Railroad; see Conecuh Valley Railroad, in Alabama